The  is the 13th edition of the Japan Film Professional Awards. It awarded the best of 2003 in film. The ceremony did not take place in this year.

Awards 
Best Film: Bright Future
Best Director: Kiyoshi Kurosawa (Bright Future, Doppelganger)
Best Actress: Chizuru Ikewaki (Josee, the Tiger and the Fish)
Best Actress: Shinobu Terajima (Vibrator, Akame 48 Waterfalls)
Best Actor: Joe Odagiri (Bright Future)
Best Actor: Tatsuya Fuji (Bright Future, The Man in White)
Best New Director: Miwa Nishikawa (Hebi Ichigo)

10 best films
 Bright Future (Kiyoshi Kurosawa)
 Vibrator (Ryūichi Hiroki)
 Josee, the Tiger and the Fish (Isshin Inudo)
 Baka no Hakobune (Nobuhiro Yamashita)
 Sayonara, Kuro (Joji Matsuoka)
 Akame 48 Waterfalls (Genjiro Arato)
 A Snake of June (Shinya Tsukamoto)
 Women in the Mirror (Yoshishige Yoshida)
 Utsukushii Natsu Kirishima (Kazuo Kuroki)
 9 Souls (Toshiaki Toyoda)
 Doppelganger (Kiyoshi Kurosawa)

References

External links
  

Japan Film Professional Awards
2004 in Japanese cinema
Japan Film Professional Awards